Zdzieszowice (1936–1945: Odertal O.S.) is a town in Krapkowice County, Opole Voivodeship, Poland, with 11,445 inhabitants (2019). The synthetic oil plant at "Schaffgotsch Benzin GmbH in Deschowitz-Beuthen, Odertal (Upper Silesia)" began production in 1939 and was a target of the Oil Campaign of World War II.

Twin towns – sister cities
See twin towns of Gmina Zdzieszowice.

Gallery

References

Cities and towns in Opole Voivodeship
Krapkowice County
Oil campaign of World War II

it:Zdzieszowice